Donald E. Felsinger is the retired Executive Chairman of Sempra Energy.

Career
After attending the University of Arizona from which he received a bachelor's degree in mechanical engineering, Felsinger entered a long career in business management, holding top positions with Enova Corporation prior to the merger that created Sempra Energy in 1998. Upon the merger he led the Sempra Energy Global Enterprises division as group president and chief executive officer, positions he held until 2004. On January 1, 2006, he became the company's CEO and a month later became chairman of the board of directors.

Felsigner is a graduate of the Stanford University executive program.

Compensation
While CEO of Sempra Energy in 2008, Donald E. Felsinger earned a total compensation of $9,106,975, which included a base salary of $1,143,957, a cash bonus of $2,530,000, stocks granted of $4,144,905, and options granted of $1,120,353.

References

External links
BusinessWeek

American businesspeople
Living people
Sempra Energy
Year of birth missing (living people)